Yongding District is one of two urban districts in Zhangjiajie City, Hunan Province, China. Located on the south of Zhangjiajie, the district is bordered to the north by Wulingyuan District and Sangzhi County, to the northeast by Cili County, to the east by Taoyuan County, to the southeast by Yuanling County, to the southwest by Yongshun County. It is divided into six subdistricts, seven towns and seven subdistricts (November 27, 2015), its government seat is Xixiping.

Administrative divisions
According to the result on adjustment of township-level administrative divisions of Yongding District on November 27, 2015, it has six subdistricts, seven towns and seven townships under its jurisdiction. they are:

7 Townships
 Hezuoqiao
 Luoshui
 Luotaping
 Qiaotou, Zhangjiajie
 Sanjiaguan
 Siduping
 Xiejiaya

7 Towns
 Jiaoziya
 Maoyanhe
 Tianmenshan Town
 Wangjiaping
 Xinqiao, Zhangjiajie
 Yinjiaxi
 Yuanguping

6 Subdistricts
 Chongwen, Zhangjiajie
 Dayongqiao
 Guanliping
 Nanzhuangping
 Xixiping
 Yongding Subdistrict

References

External links

 
County-level divisions of Hunan
Zhangjiajie